Marcella Evaristi (born 19 July 1953) is a Scottish actress, playwright and screenwriter.

Background 
Marcella Evaristi was born in Glasgow on 19 July 1953 and grew up in her parents' café next to the old Alhambra Theatre in Glasgow.  She was educated at Notre Dame High School, Glasgow and the University of Glasgow, where she achieved a B.A.(honours) in 1974.

Evaristi married theatre director Michael Boyd in 1982 and had twins, Daniel and Gabriella.  They are now divorced.

Work 
Evaristi's first play was Dorothy and the Bitch in 1976 which she performed herself on stage.  She has written stage, radio and television plays.

Stage plays 

 Dorothy and the Bitch (monologue), 1976
 Scotia's Darlings, 1978
 Sugar and Spite (revue) with Liz Lochhead, 1978
 Mouthpieces: A Musical Satirical Revue (with Liz Lochhead), 1980
 Commedia, 1983
 Thank you for Not, in Breach of the Peace (review), 1982
 Checking Out, 1984
 The Works, 1989
 Terrestrial Extras, 1985
 Trio for Strings in Three, 1987
 Visiting Company (monologue,) 1988
 The Offski Variations (monologue), 1990
 Nightflights, 2002
 The Friends of Miss Dorian Gray, 2014

Radio plays 

 Hard to Get, 1981
 Wedding Belles and Green Grasses, 1983
 The Work (adaptation of the
 stage play), 1985
 The Hat, 1988
 The Theory and Practice of Rings, 1992
 Troilus and Cressida and La-di-da-di-da, 1992
 The Gobetweenies, BBC Radio 4 Three series 2011-2013
 Going Dark, BBC Radio 4, 2021

Awards 

 Student Verse Competition Prize, BBC, 1974
 Arts Council Bursary, 1975–76
 Pye Award for Best Writer New to Television, 1982, for Eve Set the Balls of Corruption Rolling

References 

1953 births
Living people
Actresses from Glasgow